The National Shooting Sports Foundation (NSSF) is an American national trade association for the firearms industry that is based in Newtown, Connecticut. Formed in 1961, the organization has more than 8,000 members: firearms manufacturers, distributors, retailers, shooting ranges, sportsmen's clubs and media.

The NSSF mission is "To promote, protect and preserve hunting and the shooting sports". In addition to promoting gun ownership, the NSSF helps write safety and instruction standards. The NSSF sponsors the annual Shooting Hunting and Outdoor Trade Show, the (SHOT Show). The NSSF has advocated in favor of gun rights, including arguing against limits on high capacity magazines and the broad use of the term "assault weapon". It has also supported legislation allowing concealed carry and has offered proposals to prohibit the Environmental Protection Agency from regulating chemicals in ammunition as well as other sports such as fishing where lead is routinely used for its density.

Management
Steve Sanetti, the president since 2008, is a former Army captain and former president of Sturm, Ruger & Co. where he "helped direct 'the successful coordinated response to municipal lawsuits that threatened the firearms industry in the late 1990s,' according to a 2008 press release".

Doug Painter, a former NSSF president, was featured in a video released by the group in 2009. According to the Sunlight Foundation, the NSSF spent $1.7 million on lobbying efforts from 1998 to 2012.

SHOT Show
The largest gun show in the United States is the annual SHOT Show, sponsored by the NSSF. It attracted over 60,000 attendees to its 630,000 square feet of exhibition space in Las Vegas. It is among the top 25 trade shows in the country.

Industry and NSSF history

The state of Connecticut has a long history in the manufacture of guns, going back to Eli Whitney and Samuel Colt. Since 2000, as the national interest in hunting has declined according to one report, gun manufacturers have increasingly relied on the sale of high-powered semi-automatic rifles. In that context, NSSF has concentrated on marketing semi-automatic rifles.

Between 2000 and 2003 the Federal Trade Commission conducted an anti-trust investigation of gun industry players including the NSSF. It was alleged that they were boycotting Smith & Wesson due to that company's agreement with the Clinton administration to require background checks on purchasers and provide gun locks. The probe was suspended in 2003 by the Bush administration, with the NSSF's general counsel claiming it had been politically motivated.

In response to the Sandy Hook Elementary School shooting that occurred in Newtown on December 14, 2012,  from the organization's headquarters, the NSSF expressed its sympathies on its website and declined to immediately comment. The following month, Sanetti noted that his employees were personally affected by the Newtown massacre, saying in a speech at the 2013 SHOT Show: "Who among us has not been moved by that unspeakable tragedy that was inflicted by a deranged man upon the children of Newtown, Conn., our very home as the NSSF?"

NSSF and shooting range development
Within the firearms industry the National Shooting Sports Foundation promotes the development of state-of-the-art target shooting facilities by providing leadership in information, communication and partnerships between ranges, industry and community. To meet the National Shooting Sports Foundation's criteria of a Five Star facility, a range must demonstrate excellence in all aspects of management and operations. Ranges are rated on appearance, management, customer service, amenities, customer development and community relations. The first range to receive this distinction was H&H Shooting Sports in Oklahoma City, Oklahoma, there are currently 33 ranges with the distinction of a Five Star facility.

Legislation
The NSSF supported the Bipartisan Sportsmen's Act of 2014 (S. 2363; 113th Congress). The NSSF thanked Senator Thad Cochran for co-sponsoring the bill.

See also
 National Rifle Association

References

External links
 Official website
 NSSF Federal Legislation Tracker with NSSF positions

Gun rights advocacy groups in the United States
Hunting in the United States
Trade associations based in the United States
Newtown, Connecticut
Shooting sports organizations
Shooting sports in the United States
Organizations established in 1961
Sports organizations established in 1961